The 2014 Hockey India League (known as the Hero Hockey India League for sponsorship reasons), abbreviated as HIL 2014, is the second season of the professional field hockey tournament, Hockey India League. The season will see the addition of one new franchise, Kalinga Lancers, making a total of six franchises in the league.

Delhi Waveriders

Kalinga Lancers

Mumbai Magicians

Punjab Warriors

Ranchi Rhinos

Uttar Pradesh Wizards

References

See also
 Hockey India League
 2014 Hockey India League
 2014 Hockey India League players' auction

team rosters
Rosters 2014